Manganinnie is an AFI Award-winning 1980 film which follows the journey of Manganinnie, a Tasmanian Aboriginal woman who searches for her tribe with the company of a lost white girl named Joanna. Based on Beth Roberts' novel of the same name, it was directed by John Honey and was the first feature film to be financed by the short-lived Tasmanian Film Corporation.

Synopsis
During the Black War of 1830 in the penal colony of Van Diemen's Land, Manganinnie survives a raid on her village. She finds the body of her husband, Meenopeekameena, and builds him a funeral pyre.

The grieving Manganinnie journeys across vast mountains and rivers towards the coast in search of the rest of her tribe. She finds Joanna, a lost white girl, along her way. The pair develop a bond for each other despite not having a common language. Manganinnie teaches Joanna some of her traditional knowledge, and eventually initiates her into her tribe.

Ultimately however, Manganinnie comes to realise that her people and way of life has been destroyed by encroachment from white settlers. When Joanna is asleep, she carries the girl back to her family.

Joanna struggles to adapt back to life with her family. One day Manganinnie's body is found, and Joanna gives her old friend a traditional funeral using the lessons she has learned.

Production
Filming started 12 November 1979 and took five weeks.

Filming locations
 West Coast Range, Australia

Australian Premiere
The State Cinema hosted the Australian premiere of Manganinnie in August 1980. The event was attended by actors Mawuyul Yanthalawuy and Anna Ralph, as well as the Governor of Tasmania Sir Stanley Burbury and Tasmanian Premier Doug Lowe.

Reception
Despite the grim subject matter the film recovered its costs and made a small profit.

Awards
 Won AFI Award, Peter Sculthorpe – Best Original Music Score (1980)
 Won AWGIE Awards – Best Screenplay (1980)
 Winner 12th Moscow International Children's Film Festival – Best Production Design (1980)
 Winner Festival International de France (1980)

See also
 Cinema of Australia

Postscript

Anna Ralph, who played the little white girl Joanna, is now an Associate Professor of infectious diseases working at Royal Darwin Hospital looking after patients, including Aboriginal peoples.

References

External links
 Manganinnie – Archives Office of Tasmania
 
Manganinnie at Oz Movies

1980 films
1980 drama films
Australian drama films
Films about Aboriginal Australians
Films set in colonial Australia
Films set in Tasmania
1980s English-language films